Arena Poliesportiva Amadeu Teixeira is an indoor sporting arena used mostly for futsal and volleyball located in Manaus, Brazil.  The capacity of the arena is 11,800 spectators and opened in 2006. The venue is used for numerous events, like basketball, concerts, futsal, handball, volleyball and fight sports.

References

External links
Stadium information

Indoor arenas in Brazil
Sports venues in Amazonas (Brazilian state)
Basketball venues in Brazil
Volleyball venues in Brazil
Buildings and structures in Manaus